Kalpakanchery  is a revenue village and a Gram Panchayat in Tirur Taluk, Malappuram district, Kerala, India.

Kadungathukundu, Puthanathani, Kurukathani, and Randathani are four major towns around Kalpakanchery. The National Highway 66 passes through the village. The village is a centre of academic institutions and other offices. There are several educational institutions, healthcare institutions, two industrial training centres, Kalpakanchery police station, Bafakhy Yatheem Khana (orphanage), post office, Kalpakanchery Sub-registrar Office, and Kalpakanchery Panchayat Office in the town. The village had a weekly market on Wednesdays known as Melangadi Chantha. The weekly market was held at present-day Melangadi, between Puthanathani and Kadungathukundu.

Etymology
The name Kalpakanchery is believed to evolve from a combination of two Malayalam words, Kalpakam (Coconut tree) and Chery (Street), which means the street of coconut trees.

Demography
, Kalpakanchery had a population of 33,721 with 15,391 males and 18,330 females. The literacy rate of the village in 2011 was 94.37%. Malayalam is the most spoken language.

Education

As of 2011 census, the village contains 2 pre-primary schools, 13 primary schools, 5 middle schools, 3 secondary schools, 3 senior secondary schools, 3 vocational training schools, a special school for disabled, and one more school. GVHSS Kalpakanchery, established in 1958, is one of the oldest secondary schools in the area. Educational institutions in the village include:

Health
As of 2011 census, there is a Primary health centre, 3 primary health subcentres, a maternity and child welfare centre, 2 hospital alternative medicines, a dispensary, 2 veterinary hospitals, a family welfare centre, 2 charitable private hospitals, and 12 medicinal shops in the village.

A government Ayurvedic hospital and a government veterinary dispensary functions at Thozhanur near to Randathani.

Civic administration 

The region is administered by the Kalpakanchery Grama Panchayat. It is composed of 19 wards:
{ "type": "ExternalData",  "service": "geoshape",  "ids": "Q6354338"} Kalpakanchery is a part of Kuttippuram Block Panchayat and Tirur (State Assembly constituency).

Law and Order 
Kalpakanchery police station has jurisdiction over seven villages namely Kalpakanchery, Valavannur, Ponmundam, Cheriyamundam, Perumanna-Klari, Athavanad, and Tirunavaya. The station was established in 1919. It comes under Tirur court.

Connectivity
Almost every train stops here.
 Road: Kalpakanchery is well connected to the other cities by road,  National Highway-66 passes through the town. There are regular buses plying to other cities including Malappuram, Kozhikode, Kochi, Thrissur, and Coimbatore. There are a few private buses offering over night journeys to Bangalore, Trivandrum, and Coimbatore.

Notable people 
 Azad Moopen
 Odayappurath Chekkutty

See also 
 Puthanathani
 Kottakkal
 Tirur

References

External links

Tirur area
Villages in Malappuram district